This is an (incomplete) list of main career statistics page of Spanish professional tennis player Albert Costa.

Significant finals

Grand Slam finals

Singles: 1 (1–0)

Masters Series finals

Singles: 3 (1–2)

ATP career finals

Singles: 21 (12 titles, 9 runners-up)

Doubles: 1 (1 title)

Performance timelines

Singles

Top 10 wins

Tennis in Spain
Sport in Spain
Costa